Astrothelium neoinspersum is a species of corticolous (bark-dwelling), crustose lichen in the family Trypetheliaceae. Found in El Salvador, it was formally described as a new species in 2016 by Dutch lichenologist André Aptroot. The type specimen was collected by Harrie Sipman from Montecristo National Park (Metapán, Santa Ana Department); there, it was found in a rainforest growing on smooth tree bark. The lichen has a smooth and somewhat shiny, olive-green thallus with a cortex but without a prothallus. The presence of the lichen does not induce the formation of galls in the host plant. The only lichen product detected from collected specimens using thin-layer chromatography was an anthraquinone compound. The combination of characteristics of the lichen that distinguish it from others in Astrothelium are the yellow pigment in the ascomata; the form of the ascomata ("diffusely "); and the arrangement of the ascomata (in irregular lines). The bright yellow pseudostromata help distinguish Astrothelium neoinspersum from the otherwise similar A. aenascens, found in Papua New Guinea.

References

neoinspersum
Lichen species
Lichens described in 2016
Lichens of Central America
Taxa named by André Aptroot